"Used to Have It All" is a single by Dutch singer-songwriter Fais featuring Dutch DJ Afrojack. This is their second collaboration after the song "Hey".

Charts

Weekly charts

Year-end charts

Certifications

References

2016 singles
Afrojack songs